Château-la-Vallière is a commune in the Indre-et-Loire department in central France.

Château de Vaujours
The Château de Vaujours, situated 3 kilometres south of Château-la-Vallière, is an ancient fortress from the 12th to 15th centuries. It belonged to the manor of Chasteaux-en-Anjou, the future Château-la-Vallière. It was built to protect the eastern borders of Anjou.

Population

Personalities
Jean Schubnel (born in Château-la-Vallière 24 June 1894; died 1987) was a 20th-century French naive painter.

See also
Communes of the Indre-et-Loire department

References

Communes of Indre-et-Loire
Anjou